Church Green is a hamlet in the civil parish of Farway in the East Devon district of Devon, England.

Hamlets in Devon